solidDB is an in-memory relational database management system developed and sold by UNICOM Global. solidDB is designed for extreme speed as a persistent, relational in-memory database to meet performance and reliability demands of real-time applications.

Technology 
solidDB includes an in-memory database as well as a traditional disk based database, which both employ the same SQL interface, and a high availability option. Both in-memory and disk based engines coexist inside the same server process, and a single SQL statement can access data from both engines. The High Availability option maintains two copies of the data synchronized at all times. solidDB can be embedded directly into applications and run virtually unattended for lower total cost-of-ownership.

Customers 
SolidDB has historically been used as an embedded database in telecommunications equipment, network software, and similar systems. Companies using solidDB include Alcatel-Lucent, Ericsson, Cisco Systems, EMC Corporation, Hewlett-Packard, Nokia, Siemens AG and Nokia Networks.

History 
Solid was a privately held company founded in Helsinki, Finland in 1992.
Solid was acquired by IBM in late 2007. 
SolidDB was sold to UNICOM Global in 2014.

Notes

External links
 Home page for solidDB product
 Technical marketing paper on solidDB
 IBM Redbook on solidDB
 IBM solidDB: In-Memory Database Optimized for Extreme Speed and Availability, IEEE Data Engineering Bulletin, 2013

Companies based in Helsinki
Relational database management systems
Divested IBM products